The 1925 BYU Cougars football team was an American football team that represented Brigham Young University (BYU) as a member of the Rocky Mountain Conference (RMC) during the 1925 college football season. In its first season under head coach Charles J. Hart, the Cougars compiled an overall record of 3–3 with an identical mark in confernece play, tied for sixth place in the RMC, and were outscored by a total of 81 to 69.

Schedule

References

BYU
BYU Cougars football seasons
BYU Cougars football